The women's speed competition in sport climbing at the 2022 World Games took place on 14 July 2022 at the Sloss Furnaces in Birmingham, United States.

Competition format
A total of 12 athletes entered the competition. In qualification every athlete has 2 runs, best time counts. Top 8 climbers qualify to main competition.

Results

Qualification

Competition bracket

References 

Women's speed